Oklahoma Frontier is a 1939 American Western film written and directed by Ford Beebe. The film stars Johnny Mack Brown, Bob Baker, Fuzzy Knight, Anne Gwynne, James Blaine and Bob Kortman. The film was released on October 10, 1939, by Universal Pictures.

Plot

Cast        
Johnny Mack Brown as Jeff McLeod
Bob Baker as Tom Rankin
Fuzzy Knight as Windy Day
Anne Gwynne as Janet Rankin
James Blaine as George Frazier
Bob Kortman as J. W. Saunders 
Charles King as Soapy
Harry Tenbrook as Grimes
Lane Chandler as Sergeant
Horace Murphy as Mushy
Lloyd Ingraham as Judge
Joe De La Cruz as Cheyenne
Anthony Warde as Wayne

References

External links
 

1939 films
American Western (genre) films
1939 Western (genre) films
Universal Pictures films
Films directed by Ford Beebe
American black-and-white films
1930s English-language films
1930s American films